Calea ternifolia (syn. Calea zacatechichi) is a species of flowering plant in the aster family, Asteraceae. It is native to Mexico and Central America. Its English language common names include bitter-grass, Mexican calea, and dream herb.

It is used in traditional medicine and ritual in its native range.

Uses
In Mexico the plant is used as an herbal remedy for dysentery and fever. The Zoque Popoluca people call the plant tam huñi ("bitter gum") and use it to treat diarrhea and asthma, and the Mixe people know it as poop taam ujts ("white bitter herb") and use it for stomachache and fever.

The Chontal people of Oaxaca reportedly use the plant, known locally as thle-pela-kano, during divination. Isolated reports describe rituals that involve smoking a plant believed to be this species, drinking it as a tea, and placing it under a pillow to induce divinatory or lucid dreams due to its properties as an oneirogen. Zacatechichi, the former species name, is a Hispanicized form of the Nahuatl word "zacatl chichic" meaning "bitter grass". Users take the plant to help them remember their dreams; known side effects include nausea and vomiting related to the taste and mild-to-severe allergic reaction.

While quite bitter if brewed in hot water, the bitterness can be considerably masked by brewing with Osmanthus flowers, which have a compatible scent profile.

Chemical composition

Chemical compounds isolated from this species include flavones such as acacetin and sesquiterpene lactones such as germacranolides. The sesquiterpenes known as caleicines and caleochromenes may be active in its effects on sleep.

Legal status
While it is not a controlled substance under federal law in the United States, some states have considered it individually. Louisiana State Act 159 specifies that it is illegal to possess if it is intended for human consumption, but not if they are intended for ornamental or landscaping use. Tennessee proposed a bill that would have made this and many other plants classified as hallucinogenic illegal, but when the bill was passed only Salvia divinorum was banned.

This plant was banned in Poland in March 2009.

Nephrotoxicity
One study suggest that the herb may have some toxic properties towards kidneys (nephrotoxicity).

In popular culture
American composer David Woodard, who cultivated Calea ternifolia on his San Francisco estate, composed a motet entitled "Calea Zacatechichi", which he recorded with a Hispanic choir.

See also 
Oneirogen

References

ternifolia
Flora of Mexico
Flora of Central America
Entheogens
Herbal and fungal hallucinogens
Medicinal plants of North America
Oneirogens